

Rimmon (Rīmmōn) or Remmon (Remmōn) is a name in the Hebrew Bible meaning "pomegranate".

Place-names

Rimmon may refer to:
 One of the "uttermost cities" of Judah, afterwards given to Simeon (Joshua 15:21, 32; 19:7; 1 Chronicles 4:32). In Joshua 15:32, Ain and Rimmon are mentioned separately, but in Joshua 19:7 and 1 Chronicles 4:32 the two words are probably to be combined, as forming together the name of one place, Ain-Rimmon = "the spring of the pomegranate" (compare Nehemiah 11:29). It has been identified with Um er-Rumamin, about 13 miles south-west of Hebron. Zechariah 14:10 describes it as "south of Jerusalem," to distinguish it from other Rimmons; and uses it in conjunction with Geba to describe the latitudinal span of the kingdom of Judah.
 The Rock of Rimmon, where the Benjamites fled (Judges 20:45, 47; 21:13), and where they maintained themselves for four months after the battle at Gibeah. It is the present village of Rammun, "on the very edge of the hill country, with a precipitous descent toward the Jordan valley", supposed to be the site of Ai. Israeli settlement Rimonim nearby is named after the biblical place.

Syrian cult image 
Rimmon was a Syrian cult image and temple, mentioned only in the Second Book of Kings. In Syria, this deity was known as Baal ("the Lord" par excellence), in Assyria as Ramanu ("the Thunderer").

According to the biblical narrative, the Aramean commander Naaman, having been healed of his leprosy by the Israelite prophet Elisha, requested pardon from God for continuing to minister to the King of Syria who would continue to worship in the Temple of Rimmon. Elisha granted him this pardon.

People 
Rimon is mentioned as a man of Beeroth of the tribe of Benjamin, whose two sons, Baanah and Rechab, were captains of the army of Ish-bosheth, son of King Saul.

Extra-biblical usage 
 An adornment of the Torah scroll (usually plural: Torah rimonim), from רימון, meaning pomegranate
 "Rimmon", a poem by Rudyard Kipling written in 1903 after the Boer War.
 Rimmon, an Israeli weekly publication 
According to The Urantia Book, published in 1955, Rimmon was a small city in the region of Galilee which "had once been dedicated to the worship of a Babylonian god of the air, Ramman".
Rimmon mentioned in Dorothy Sayers' "Strong Poison" when one of the main characters, Ms Climpson, revises unwelcome duties of her life.

References

Hebrew Bible places
Deities in the Hebrew Bible

he:רימון
ja:リンモーン